Bojan the Bear is the title and the protagonist of the Slovenian animation children's television series. It's the best-known and most successful Slovenian cartoon series.

Bojan the Bear is a painter who paints his own world with three colours. A friend of his enters the world, using two other colours - white and black - to paint glaciers.

The cartoon was created by Serbian-born Branko Ranitović and Slovenian Dušan Povh. Series was in original run from 1985-1999. Animated series was broadcast on Slovenian national television RTV Ljubljana and broadcast on United Kingdom television The Children's Channel. Character was originally animated by Zdenko Gašparović and Pavao Štalter.

List of episodes

Season 1: 1985

Season 2: 1988

Season 3: 1995

Season 4: 1996

Season 5: 1998

Season 6: 1999

 List is not completed. Numerous episodes (Fireman, Apples, Xmas, Rainbow, Fischerman, Picnic, Bees, Small House, Painter,...) are missing.

Broadcast UK history
The Children's Channel (1988–1994)

VHS UK history
Screen Legends (1988–1993)

Videos
In 1988, "Bojan The Bear - Athlete" was released on a The Children's Channel which was exclusively sold and distributed under license from Carlton Communications along with Bojan the Bear and many more.

External links
 Bojan the Bear at Slovenian Film Fund
 Bojan the Bear at imdb.com
 Bojan the Bear at youtube.com
 Bojan the Bear at slocartoon.net (Slovene)

Slovenian television series
1980s Slovenian television series
1990s Slovenian television series
1985 Slovenian television series debuts
1999 Slovenian television series endings